Warm Springs may refer to:

Warm Springs Apache, a subdivision of the Chiricahua Apache
Warm Springs, California, in Riverside County
Warm Springs, Fremont, California
Warm Springs Elementary School, elementary school in Fremont, California
Warm Springs/South Fremont station, a Bay Area Rapid Transit station in Fremont, California
Warm Springs, Georgia, location of Franklin Delano Roosevelt's Little White House
Roosevelt Warm Springs Institute for Rehabilitation.
Warm Springs (film), a 2005 movie about Roosevelt's struggle with paralytic illness
Warm Springs, Montana
Warm Springs, Nevada
Warm Springs Natural Area 
Warm Springs Indian Reservation, Oregon
Warm Springs, Oregon, located on the Warm Springs Indian Reservation
 Warm Springs bands, common contemporary name of the Tenino people
 Warm Springs (Utah), at Warm Springs Mountain, east Goshen Valley, Utah
 Warm Springs, Virginia
 An early alternative name for Berkeley Springs, West Virginia
Warm Mineral Springs, Florida